Events from the year 1987 in South Korea.

Incumbents
President: Chun Doo-hwan
Prime Minister: 
 until 26 May: Lho Shin-yong 
 26 May-14 July: Lee Han-key 
 starting 14 July: Kim Chung-yul

Events

 June 10 - June Struggle
 November 29  - Korean Air Flight 858 was blown by the detonated bomb by the North Korean agents.

Births

 March 13 - Lee Young-sil, field hockey player
 April 20 - Park Mi-ra, handball player
 April 25 - Jay Park, singer, rapper and actor
 May 8 - Kim Eun-hye, sport shooter
 May 13 - Chang Hye-jin, archer
 June 21 - Kim Ryeowook, singer
 June 22 - Lee Min-ho, actor
 July 5 - Ji Chang-wook, actor
 September 30 - Joo Won, actor
 October 5 - Park Soyeon, singer and actress
 October 31 - Sim Hae-in, handball player
 November 4 - T.O.P, singer, rapper and actor
 November 21 - Jang Soo-ji, field hockey player
 November 25 - An Hyo-ju, field hockey player

Deaths

 June 22 - Yun Il-seon, politician, pathologist, and anatomist (b. 1896)

Full date unknown
Kim Se-jin, politician (b. 1965)

See also
List of South Korean films of 1987
Years in Japan
Years in North Korea

References

 
South Korea
Years of the 20th century in South Korea
1980s in South Korea
South Korea